The women's high jump event  at the 2002 European Athletics Indoor Championships was held on March 1–2.

Medalists

Results

Qualification
Qualification: Qualification Performance 1.94 (Q) or at least 8 best performers advanced to the final.

Final

References
Results

High jump at the European Athletics Indoor Championships
High
2002 in women's athletics